Livia Veranes (born 14 September 1993) is a Cuban handball player. She plays for the club Santiago de Cuba and is member of the Cuban national team. She competed at the 2015 World Women's Handball Championship in Denmark.

References

Cuban female handball players
1993 births
Living people
Handball players at the 2015 Pan American Games
Pan American Games competitors for Cuba